Richard Allan Ferrell (1926–2005) was an American theoretical physicist, specializing in condensed matter physics and statistical physics.

Biography
Richard A. Ferrell grew up in Orange County, California. During WW II he served in the U. S. Navy. His mother, Elsie Hopper Ferrell (1906–1995), graduated in 1949 with an M.D. from the University of California, Los Angeles School of Medicine. He graduated from the California Institute of Technology with a B.S. in 1948 and an M.S. in 1949. He matriculated in 1949 at Princeton University as a graduate student with fellowship granted by the Atomic Energy Commission and in 1951 won the $1000 top prize in an essay contest sponsored by the Gravity Research Foundation. He married Miriam Laura Conover in 1951. In 1952 he received his Ph.D. from Princeton University. As a postdoc he spent the academic year 1952–1953 under the supervision of Werner Heisenberg at the Max Planck Institute for Physics (which at that time was located in Göttingen). At the invitation of John S. Toll, Ferrell joined in 1953 the faculty of the University of Maryland, where he was promoted to full professor in 1959 and retired as professor emeritus in 1993. He was the author or co-author of more than 150 scientific articles and could write in French, German, and Russian. His 1960 article Electron-nucleus hyperfine interactions in atoms was mentioned in Robert H. Romer's list of memorable papers published in the American Journal of Physics from the years 1933 to 1990. His sabbatical leaves included visiting positions at the CERN laboratory in Geneva and the Max Planck Institutes in Munich and Stuttgart.

In May 1976 Ferrell with several American colleagues attended a Soviet-American physics symposium and also attended the Sunday Seminar of Mark Azbel and other refuseniks. After returning to the United States, Ferrell and his colleagues published a letter of support for the refuseniks.

He not only planted trees in University Park, Maryland, but also helped to persuade officials to have trees planted along U.S. Route 1 in College Park, Maryland and on the campus of the University of Maryland. Upon his death he was survived by his widow, a daughter, a son, and three grandchildren.

In 2001 the University of Maryland established the Richard A. Ferrell Distinguished Faculty Fellowship.

Ferrell-Glover-Tinkham sum rule
The Ferrell-Glover-Tinkham sum rule "asserts that the finite frequency response which is lost in the superconducting transition reappears at the zero frequency 'superconductivity' delta-function." The sum rule is important for many high-Tc superconductivity analyses.

As postdocs in 1956, Michael Tinkham and Rolf Eldridge Glover III demonstrated "the existence of a superconducting "energy gap" by showing that light below a certain frequency was transmitted much more readily through a superconducting film than through a normal metal film. This counter-intuitive result was a landmark confirmation of the famous Bardeen-Cooper-Schrieffer theory of superconductivity." Subsequently, Glover and Tinkham collaborated with Ferrell on the theory of their discovery.

Selected publications
  (over 500 citations)
 
 
 
  (over 500 citations)
  (over 450 citations)
 
  (over 850 citations)
 
 
  (over 3750 citations)
  1967
 
 
  (over 550 citations)

References

1926 births
2005 deaths
20th-century American physicists
21st-century American physicists
Condensed matter physicists
Theoretical physicists
People from Santa Ana, California
California Institute of Technology alumni
Princeton University alumni
University System of Maryland faculty